Darin Andonov (born 2 August 1986)  is a Bulgarian football player, currently playing for Kaliakra Kavarna as a defender.

References

External links

Living people
1986 births
Bulgarian footballers
Association football defenders
PFC Kaliakra Kavarna players
PFC Spartak Varna players
First Professional Football League (Bulgaria) players
People from Kavarna